Metin Çıkmaz (born 1943) is a Turkish wrestler. He competed in the men's Greco-Roman 52 kg at the 1968 Summer Olympics.

References

External links
 

1943 births
Living people
Turkish male sport wrestlers
Olympic wrestlers of Turkey
Wrestlers at the 1968 Summer Olympics
People from Kozan, Adana